Hasan Mohamed Hasan Ali Al-Moharrami (Arabic:حسن المحرمي) (born 6 June 1996) is an Emirati international footballer who plays as a defender for Emirati club Baniyas.

External links

References

1996 births
Living people
Emirati footballers
People from Abu Dhabi
Association football defenders
Baniyas Club players
UAE Pro League players
UAE First Division League players
United Arab Emirates international footballers